The term guban refers collectively to a small drum and paiban (clapper), which are played simultaneously, by a single player, in traditional Chinese music.

The drum, which may be a bangu or some other type of drum with a high-pitched head of small diameter, is played with a stick that is held in one hand, and the clapper, which is called pāibǎn (拍板), bǎn (板), tánbǎn (檀板, literally "sandalwood clapper"), mùbǎn (木板), or shūbǎn (书板), is played by the other hand. The clapper consists of two flat pieces of hardwood (either zitan, hongmu, or hualimu rosewood) or bamboo that are tied loosely together on one end. It is held vertically by one hand and clapped together, producing a sharp clacking sound. Somewhat confusingly, the clapper is sometimes also referred to, without the drum, as guban.

The guban is used to accompany some genres of shuochang (Chinese story-singing), as well as in Beijing opera, kunqu, and Yue opera. It is also used in instrumental music, such as Jiangnan sizhu, Chaozhou instrumental music, Sunan chuida (苏南吹打), nanguan, shifan luogu (十番锣鼓), and Shanxi batao (山西八套).

See also
Bamboo clapper
Whip (instrument)

External links
Guban photo

Chinese musical instruments
Concussion idiophones